Niuland is the headquarters of the Niuland District of the Indian state of Nagaland. It includes several villages including Niuland, it is mainly inhabited by the Sümi Nagas.

References

Cities and towns in Niuland district